Spy in the Vatican, 1941–45 is an autobiographical writing by author Branko Bokun. It was first published in 1973, in the United Kingdom by Tom Stacey and in the United States by Praeger.

The book is about Bokun's experiences in wartime Rome working for the Red Cross, and includes a collection of anecdotes on rulers and the ruled, and on the half-world of spies and counter-spies.

External links
Vita books — Branko Bokun's books website

1973 non-fiction books